Pat Maddalena (born June 26, 1978 in Welland, Ontario) is a Canadian professional lacrosse player who last played for the Toronto Rock in the National Lacrosse League. In 2009, Maddalena was ranked number 25 on NLLInsider.com's top 50 players in the NLL. During the 2009 NLL season, he was named a reserve to the All-Star game. As of the 2012 NLL season, Maddalena is no longer playing for the league.

When not playing lacrosse, Maddalena is a chiropractor, with a practice in St. Catharines, Ontario, Canada.

Junior career
Maddalena played four years of Junior "A" lacrosse with the Burlington Chiefs. In 1996, he was awarded the "P.C.O Trophy" for Rookie of the Year. Maddalena was also awarded the "Gaylord Powless Award" for Ability/Sportsmanship in 1998 and the All-Star Game M.V.P. in 1999.

Statistics

NLL
Reference:

Canadian Lacrosse Association

References

1978 births
Living people
Arizona Sting players
Buffalo Bandits players
Canadian lacrosse players
Lacrosse people from Ontario
National Lacrosse League All-Stars
New York Titans (lacrosse) players
Orlando Titans players
Sportspeople from Welland
Toronto Rock players